The 1957 Women's Western Open was contested from April 25–28 at Montgomery Country Club. It was the 28th edition of the Women's Western Open.

This event was won by Patty Berg.

Final leaderboard

External links
Daytona Beach Morning Journal source

Women's Western Open
Golf in Alabama
Sports in Montgomery, Alabama
Women's Western Open
Women's Western Open
Women's Western Open
Women's Western Open
Women's sports in Alabama